William Stokes (1 October 1804 – 10 January 1878) was an Irish physician, who was Regius Professor of Physic at the University of Dublin. He graduated from the University of Edinburgh Medical School with an MD in 1825 later returning the practice in Dublin at Meath Hospital. He went on to create two important works on cardiac and pulmonary diseases – A Treatise on the Diagnosis and Treatment of Diseases of the Chest (1837) and The Diseases of the Heart and Aorta (1854) – as well as one of the first treatises on the use of the stethoscope. He emphasised the importance of clinical examination in forming diagnoses, and of ward-based learning for students of medicine.

Both Cheyne–Stokes breathing (the alternation of apnoea with tachypnoea) and Stokes–Adams syndrome are named after him.  Stokes' sign is a severe throbbing in the abdomen, at the right of the umbilicus, in acute enteritis.  Stokes law is that a muscle situated above an inflamed membrane is often affected with paralysis.

In 1858 he was elected a foreign member of the Royal Swedish Academy of Sciences. In June 1861 he was elected a Fellow of the Royal Society as: "The Author of A work on the Diseases of the Lungs, and of a work on the Diseases of the Heart and Aorta – and of other contributions to Pathological Science. Eminent as a Physician". He was elected President of the Royal Irish Academy for 1874–76. 

His son Sir William Stokes published a biography of William Stokes in 1898. Another son, Whitley Stokes, was a notable lawyer and Celtic scholar, his daughter Margaret Stokes an archaeologist and writer and his father Whitley (senior) also a noted physician.

References

Other reading 

1804 births
1878 deaths
Irish cardiologists
Alumni of the University of Edinburgh
Members of the Royal Swedish Academy of Sciences
Fellows of the Royal Society
Presidents of the Royal Irish Academy
Recipients of the Pour le Mérite (civil class)
Burials at St. Fintan's Cemetery, Sutton
Irish Protestants
19th-century Irish medical doctors
Physicians of the Meath Hospital
Presidents of the Royal College of Physicians of Ireland
People from Howth